Eduardo Simone (born Buenos Aires, 16 October 1974) is an Argentine rugby union footballer. He plays as a centre.

He started at a very young age playing for his beloved "Liceo Naval", in Buenos Aires, where he eventually got back to finish his career. He played for Bristol Shoguns, in England, from 1999 to 2001.

Simone had 35 caps for Argentina, from 1996 to 2002, scoring 9 tries, 45 points on aggregate. He was selected for the 1999 Rugby World Cup finals, playing five matches.

External links
Eduardo Simone International Statistics

1974 births
Living people
Argentine rugby union players
Rugby union centres
Argentina international rugby union players
Argentina international rugby sevens players
Rugby union players from Buenos Aires